Antonio Nuzzi (3 August 1926 – 8 September 2016) was an Italian Catholic archbishop.

Nuzzi served as Archbishop of Sant'Angelo dei Lombardi-Conza-Bisaccia and as Bishop of Nusco. He then was the head of the combined Archdiocese of Sant' Angelo dei Lombardi-Conza-Nusco-Bisacci. Lastly, he served as Bishop of Teramo-Atri.

Biography 
Antonio Nuzzi was born on 3 August 1926 in Bojano, a comune in the Province of Campobasso and the Italian region of Molise.

Nuzzi was ordained a priest on 2 April 1949 and was incardinated in the Archdiocese of Conza-Sant'Angelo dei Lombardi-Bisaccia. Pope John Paul II appointed him Archbishop of Sant'Angelo dei Lombardi-Bisaccia and Bishop of Nusco on 21 February 1981. He was consecrated a bishop on 15 March of that year by Sebastiano Baggio, the Prefect of the Congregation for Bishops, with Archbishop Pietro Santoro and Bishop Angelo Criscito as co-consecrators.

After unification of the Diocese of Nusco with the Archdiocese of Sant'Angelo dei Lombardi-Conza-Bisaccia, Nuzzi was appointed the first Archbishop of Sant'Angelo dei Lombardi-Conza-Nusco-Bisaccia. On 31 December 1988, he was appointed Archbishop-Bishop of Teramo-Atri.

On 24 August 2002, Pope John Paul II accepted his resignation due to age. He died on 8 September 2016.

References

External links 
 Archdiocese of Sant'Angelo dei Lombardi-Conza-Nusco-Bisaccia
 Diocese of Teramo-Atri

1926 births
2016 deaths
20th-century Italian Roman Catholic archbishops
21st-century Italian Roman Catholic archbishops
People from the Province of Campobasso
Bishops appointed by Pope John Paul II
Archbishops of Sant'Angelo dei Lombardi-Conza-Nusco-Bisaccia